The Columbia County Spotlight, previously known as the Scappoose Spotlight and the South County Spotlight, is a weekly newspaper in Columbia County, Oregon, United States, established in 1961. It covers local news, sports, business and community events, publishes weekly on Fridays, and has a circulation between 3,600 and 4,500.

The paper serves Scappoose and St. Helens, and covers communities along Highway 30 from Linnton and Sauvie Island to Clatskanie. The editorial staff is based in Scappoose, while some administration and creative services are based in Milwaukie at the headquarters of Pamplin Media Group, which owns the newspaper. The Spotlight is one of a number of community newspapers in the group, including the Forest Grove News-Times and the Hillsboro Tribune.

Reporter Tyler Graf won a first place award for feature business writing for a Spotlight article in 2012. Graf, who had recently come to the paper from the Daily Journal of Commerce, soon moved on to the nearby Daily Astorian. The newspaper won four awards in the Oregon Newspaper Publishers Association Better Newspaper Contest in 2015, including second place for best editorial, third place for best feature, second place for best graphics and first place for best sports photo. The Spotlight is a general member of the association. Its coverage has been cited by other newspapers in the area, including The Oregonian, and it is part of the Northwest News Partnership, along with Daily Astorian and the EO Media Group.

Darryl Swan, who had previously served as the paper's news editor, was appointed publisher in 2008 and remained in that role until 2020. In 2020, Nikki DeBuse was named publisher and Mark Miller, who reported for the Spotlight from 2013 to 2015, was named editor.

References

External links 
 Official website

Newspapers published in Oregon
Columbia County, Oregon
1961 establishments in Oregon
Newspapers published by Pamplin Media Group
Publications established in 1961